Jaanus Sirel (born 29 July 1975 in Pechory, Russia) is an Estonian former professional footballer. He was playing the position of defender and midfielder.

Former clubs include DAG Tartu, Lelle SK, JK Viljandi Tulevik, FC Kuressaare, FC Elva, JK Maag Tartu and JK Maag Tammeka Tartu.

Sirel played once for the Estonia national team.

References

1975 births
People from Pechory
Living people
Estonian footballers
Estonia international footballers
Viljandi JK Tulevik players
FC Kuressaare players
Tartu JK Tammeka players
FC Elva players
Association football defenders
Association football midfielders
JK Tervis Pärnu players
JK Maag Tartu players